Tangzhuang Station is a station of Line 3, Suzhou Rail Transit. The station is located in Suzhou Industrial Park, Jiangsu. It has been in use since December 25, 2019; when Line 3 first opened to the public. Upon completion of Line 8, the station will act as one of three interchanges between the two lines.

References 

Railway stations in Jiangsu
Suzhou Rail Transit stations
Railway stations in China opened in 2019